Hola Prystan (P241) is a Project R1415 (NATO code: Flamingo class) anti-sabotage boat of the Ukrainian Navy. Built in 1986, she has been in Ukrainian Navy service since 1997.

History

1986-1997
In 1986 harbor boat Project R1415 Flamingo class, was laid down at Sosnovka Shipyard in Sosnovka Kirov Oblast. Boats Yard number was #59. Same year it began service with Black Sea Fleet of the Soviet Navy.

From 1995 to August 1997 boat was part of the joint Russo-Ukrainian Black Sea Fleet under bilateral command (and Soviet Navy flag).

1997-2014
On 28 May 1997, Russia and Ukraine signed several agreements regarding the fleet including the Partition Treaty. This finally established an independent Ukrainian Navy and transferred the boat to its control. On 1 August 1997, the boat was renamed U241 Hola Prystan after the town in Kherson Oblast, Hola Prystan.

In 2012, boat was serving as part of 1st separate division of protection and maintenance of the water area.

In January 2013, when 24th separate River Boat Division based in Western Naval Base "South" was created, Hola Prystan was assigned to that unit.

7 February 2013, boat took part in ensuring the survivability of ships exercise. Boat under command of Senior lieutenant Oleksii Melnyk trained to provide assistance to a destroyed ship.

In May 2014, ship took part in 2 day exercise, along with 5 other boats.

2014-present

During Annexation of Crimea by the Russian Federation in March 2014, most of Ukrainian Navy vessels were captured by Russian forces. Hola Prystan was one of 10 ships that remained in Ukrainian control.

When in 2014, the 24th River Boat Division was disbanded, its former units were transferred to 1st Division of Protection and Security.

Ship underwent major repairs in Shipyard Ukraina in Odesa during 2015. Repairs began in August.

In 2018, boats Pennant number was changed from U241 to P241. Hola Prystan also took part in annual Exercise Sea Breeze.

Senior Lieutenant Pavlo Hladchenko was commander of boat prior to August 2019. He was then sent to US to take command and train with crew of Ukrainian patrol vessel Starobilsk.

On September 24, 2019, a Turkish Coast Guard SAR35 type boat TCSG71 visited Odesa and was escorted by Hola Prystan.

In September 2020, work was completed on restoring hull structure, main engine system and many other components.

References

Sources

Ships of the Ukrainian Navy
Hola Prystan
Ships involved in the Russo-Ukrainian War